Robert Templeton McIlveen (18 June 1919 – 29 June 1996) was an Australian rules footballer who played with Richmond in the Victorian Football League (VFL).

McIlveen played for Richmond while he was serving in the Australian Army during the Second World Wa.

Notes

External links 

1919 births
1996 deaths
VFL/AFL players born outside Australia
Australian rules footballers from Victoria (Australia)
Richmond Football Club players